The BMW G 310 R is an entry-level standard motorcycle developed jointly by BMW and TVS Motor Company of India. It is BMW's first, modern, low-end, sub-300 cc, beginner motorcycle sold under the BMW Motorrad brand. It debuted in November 2015 with global sales beginning in 2018.

The bike is powered by a four-valve  liquid-cooled single cylinder engine shared with the TVS Apache RR 310 that BMW says produces  power at 9,500 rpm and  torque at 7,500 rpm. The engine configuration has the intake in front of the engine, and the exhaust behind it.

BMW released the G 310 GS, an adventure bike based on the G 310 R, on July 19, 2018.

History
In 2013 BMW announced they were collaborating with motorcycle manufacturer TVS for production of a series of sub-500 cc bikes in Tamil Nadu. These motorcycles were targeted for developing markets, markets with prominence of lower displacement bikes, and as entry-level sport bikes in developed markets. This was the first time that BMW Motorrad ventured into developing the sub-500 cc bikes.

BMW K03 was the code-name given to the first collaborative product of BMW-TVS. It was a test bike which was developed in India and sent to Germany for further testing and modifications.

In October 2015 in Brazil, the BMW G 310 Stunt was the first concept bike unveiled by BMW Motorrad. The commercial version of the concept was officially unveiled by BMW Motorrad the next month, at EICMA 2015 in Milan, Italy, and was shown in India at the 13th Auto Expo 2016. The bike was commercially released on July 18 globally.

The G 310 R is marketed in different segments in different countries worldwide. The Indian website Rushlane, based on a BMW promotional video, calls the G310 R "not an entry level motorcycle but a premium lightweight and compact sport bike", while the US magazine Cycle World describes the same bike as "entry-level" and "a compact muscular-type naked sport bike".

Production
BMW G 310 R was developed with an intent to increase BMW's presence in global markets. It was developed in both Europe and India. The design of the bike was originally engineered by BMW in Munich, Germany, and is built and assembled at TVS Motor Company's Hosur plant in Indian state of Tamil Nadu.

Specifications
It has self start, static rev limiter, counterbalance shaft, wet sump, and electronic fuel injection and requires at least 95 RON petrol. It is compatible with up to 10% ethanol (E10).

It has a side-mounted inclined exhaust, a kickstand sensor, and a plastic engine spoiler.

The instrument panel consist of a monochrome segment LCD display with engine temperature meter.

There are two auxiliary power sockets and a steering lock.

The graphics are implemented using decals.

It has a pillion seat, pillion footrests, and rear handles.

The G 310 R has a length of 1988 mm, width of 896 mm and height of 1227 mm, a wheelbase of 1374 mm, and a seat height of 785 mm. The steering angle is 64.9°. It has an upside down fork and a mono rear shock absorber with adjustable preload. The bike has a front 110/70 R17 and a rear 150/60 R17 Michelin Pilot Street Radial tubeless tyre and 5-spoke alloy rims. The braking of the bike features a dual-channel anti-lock braking system, with the front using a single 300 mm disc, radially-bolted 4-piston fixed caliper brake and the rear, a single 240 mm disc, single-piston floating caliper brake. It has an axial front master brake cylinder. The brakes are made by ByBre.

It has "no brag-worthy goodies like a traction control system or a quick shifter" and does not use CAN bus.  Compares to the rival KTM 390 Duke, the G 310 R lacks Bluetooth connectivity, a full-colour display, and switchable ABS.

2021 facelift
Since 2021, it is Euro 5 compliant and has Idle Speed Control, electronic throttle control and an assist-and-slipper clutch, as well as adjustable levers, LED headlight and indicators.

2022 facelift

Performance

Some performance tests listed here were conducted by Otomotif tabloid from Indonesia in July 2017.

References

External links
  at BMW Motorrad USA

G310R
Standard motorcycles
Motorcycles introduced in 2015